Salernes is a commune in the Var department in the Provence-Alpes-Côte d'Azur region in southeastern France.

Notable people
 Paul Cotte (1825-1907), politician
 Jacques de Bourbon Busset (1912-2001), novelist, essayist and diplomat
 Serge Santucci (born 1944), sculptor

See also
Communes of the Var department

References

Communes of Var (department)